Sokolniki is the name of several rural localities in Russia.

Modern localities
Sokolniki, Gvardeysky District, Kaliningrad Oblast, a settlement in Slavinsky Rural Okrug of Gvardeysky District in Kaliningrad Oblast
Sokolniki, Zelenogradsky District, Kaliningrad Oblast, a settlement in Kovrovsky Rural Okrug of Zelenogradsky District in Kaliningrad Oblast
Sokolniki, Kemerovo Oblast, a settlement in Proskokovskaya Rural Territory of Yurginsky District in Kemerovo Oblast; 
Sokolniki, Kurgan Oblast, a village in Suleymanovsky Selsoviet of Safakulevsky District in Kurgan Oblast; 
Sokolniki, Leningrad Oblast, a village in Oredezhskoye Settlement Municipal Formation of Luzhsky District in Leningrad Oblast; 
Sokolniki, Dmitrovsky District, Moscow Oblast, a village in Gabovskoye Rural Settlement of Dmitrovsky District in Moscow Oblast; 
Sokolniki, Istrinsky District, Moscow Oblast, a village in Yermolinskoye Rural Settlement of Istrinsky District in Moscow Oblast; 
Sokolniki, Smolensk Oblast, a village in Molkovskoye Rural Settlement of Kardymovsky District in Smolensk Oblast
Sokolniki, Tambov Oblast, a selo in Kryukovsky Selsoviet of Morshansky District in Tambov Oblast
Sokolniki, Tver Oblast, a settlement in Sokolnicheskoye Rural Settlement of Kuvshinovsky District in Tver Oblast
Sokolniki, Vologda Oblast, a village in Nikolo-Ramensky Selsoviet of Cherepovetsky District in Vologda Oblast

Abolished localities
Sokolniki, Tula Oblast, a former town in Novomoskovsky District of Tula Oblast; merged into the town of Novomoskovsk in October 2008

Alternative names
Sokolniki, alternative name of Sokolnikovo, a village under the administrative jurisdiction of Domodedovo Town Under Oblast Jurisdiction in Moscow Oblast; 
Sokolniki, alternative name of Sokolnikovo, a selo in Yurlovskoye Rural Settlement of Mozhaysky District in Moscow Oblast;